Mount Dulit is a mountain in Borneo. It is a western outlier of the Bornean cordillera and is largely covered with montane tropical rainforest. It has given its name to various plants and animals including the Dulit frogmouth (Batrachostomus harterti), Dulit partridge (Rhizothera dulitensis), the frog Rhacophorus dulitensis, the caecilian Ichthyophis dulitensis, the trilobite beetle genus Duliticola and the Vatica dulitensis tree. It is the site from which Charles Hose collected the holotype specimen of the rare and elusive Hose's palm civet (Diplogale hosei) in 1891.

References

 
 
 

Dulit
Borneo montane rain forests